Hyalinella may refer to:
 Hyalinella (bryozoan), a genus of bryozoans in the family Plumatellidae
 Hyalinella (alga), a genus of alga in the family Cymatosiraceae